The Changhua City Library is a public library in Changhua City, Changhua County, Taiwan.

History
The library was inaugurated on 21 March 2004.

Transportation
The library is accessible within walking distance south east of Changhua Station of Taiwan Railways.

See also
 Education in Taiwan

References

External links
  

2004 establishments in Taiwan
Buildings and structures in Changhua County
Changhua City
Libraries established in 2004
Public libraries in Taiwan